Terrence Lamont Rencher (born February 19, 1973) is an American former professional basketball player. He is an assistant coach for the Oklahoma State Cowboys.

Playing career
Rencher was a prep star at St. Raymond High School for Boys in the Bronx, New York, earning New York City MVP honors in his senior year. Rencher attended the University of Texas at Austin, being drawn to the high-paced tempo of play that coach Tom Penders employed. There he finished his career with 2,306 points (making him both the school's and Southwest Conference's all-time career scorer in men's basketball) and 440 assists.

The Washington Bullets selected Rencher in the 1995 NBA draft, but his draft rights were traded along with Rex Chapman to the Miami Heat for the draft rights to Jeff Webster and Ed Stokes. He was traded midway through his rookie season (1995–96) with the Heat to the Phoenix Suns, in exchange for Tony Smith. Internationally, he played for Bnei Herzliya in Israel, Pallacanestro Cantù, Basket Rimini and Viola Reggio Calabria in Italy, KK Split in Croatia and Telekom Baskets Bonn and RheinEnergie Köln in Germany, amongst others.

Post-playing career
Rencher moved back to the United States in 2006 and enrolled at UT for the 2007 spring semester. In addition to taking three semesters of classes and serving as a student mentor, Rencher also served as the basketball program director at the Regents School of Austin and coach of the boys' varsity team.

His college coaching career began as a graduate assistant at Saint Louis University under the late Rick Majerus during the 2008–09 season.
In 2009–11 he worked as an assistant coach at Texas State University under Doug Davalos.
In 2011–12 he worked as an assistant coach at the University of Tulsa under Doug Wojcik.
In 2012–13 he worked as an assistant coach at Sam Houston State University under Jason Hooten.
In 2013–15 he worked as an assistant coach at Texas State University under Danny Kaspar.
In 2015-17 he worked as an assistant coach at University of New Mexico under Craig Neal.
In 2017-19 he worked as an assistant coach at University of San Diego under Sam Scholl.
In 2019-2021 he worked as an assistant coach at Creighton University under Greg McDermott. From 2021-present he works at Oklahoma State University under Mike Boynton.

He was hired as an assistant coach at University of New Mexico in July 2015 to work under head coach Craig Neal. After two winning seasons, he accepted a new position as an assistant coach at University of San Diego in 2017. In his first year at University of San Diego, Rencher assisted the team in earning a 20-win 2017-2018 season, inclusive of a quarterfinals appearance in the CollegeInsider.com (CIT) Post-Season Tournament.  In his second year, Rencher assisted first-time head coach Sam Scholl in improving the team to a 21-win 2018-2019 season, which included a semi-finals finish in the West Coast ConferenceTournament, as well as a National Invitational Tournament (NIT) appearance, the program's first in school history.

As of 2019, Terrence Rencher has served as an assistant coach at Creighton University to head coach Greg McDermott.  During this time, the Blue Jays clinched the Big East Men's Basketball Conference Regular Season Championship and McDermott achieved Big East Conference Men's Basketball Coach of the Year for the 2019-2020 season, and were set to appear in both the 2020 Big East men's basketball tournament, as well as the 2020 NCAA Division I men's basketball tournament prior to cancellation of those events.  Most recently, the Creighton Blue Jays earned a spot in the Sweet 16 of the 2021 NCAA Division I men's basketball tournament for the first time in recent school history.

References

External links
NBA stats @ basketball-reference.com
New Mexico biography
Texas State biography
Sam Houston State biography
Tulsa biography

1973 births
Living people
American expatriate basketball people in Croatia
American expatriate basketball people in Germany
American expatriate basketball people in Israel
American expatriate basketball people in Italy
American men's basketball players
Apollon Patras B.C. players
Basketball coaches from New York (state)
Basketball players from New York City
Basket Rimini Crabs players
Bnei HaSharon players
Bnei Hertzeliya basketball players
Creighton Bluejays men's basketball coaches
Grand Rapids Hoops players
Greek Basket League players
High school basketball coaches in the United States
KK Split players
Miami Heat players
New Mexico Lobos men's basketball coaches
Oklahoma State Cowboys basketball coaches
Pallacanestro Cantù players
Phoenix Suns players
Point guards
Sam Houston Bearkats men's basketball coaches
San Diego Toreros men's basketball coaches
Sportspeople from the Bronx
Telekom Baskets Bonn players
Texas Longhorns men's basketball players
Texas State Bobcats men's basketball coaches
Tulsa Golden Hurricane men's basketball coaches
Washington Bullets draft picks